No. 622 Squadron RAF is a reserve aircrew squadron of the Royal Auxiliary Air Force. During World War II, it operated as a bomber squadron of the Royal Air Force. Post-war it served shortly as a transport squadron in the RAuxAF.

History

World War II
No. 622 Squadron was first formed at RAF Mildenhall in Suffolk on 10 August 1943, equipped with
Stirling Mk.III bombers, as part of 3 Group in Bomber Command.
It re-equipped with Lancaster Mk.III bombers in December, after briefly operating Lancaster Mk.Is that month. It operated in Bomber Command's Main Force as part of No 3 Group until April 1945 when it moved to humanitarian duties dropping food to the Dutch (Operation Manna), repatriating POWs (Operation Exodus) and ferrying troops home from Italy. The Squadron was disbanded at Mildenhall on 15 August 1945.

1950 to 1953
Unlike many of its contemporaries 622 Squadron was reformed post-war as a Royal Auxiliary Air Force transport squadron at RAF Blackbushe on 15 December 1950. It now operated Valettas and consisted of a nucleus of regular pilots and Radio Officers  drawn from local firm Airwork Ltd. This  proved to be a success, and the squadron operated in the Suez conflict. The squadron disbanded again on 30 September 1953 due to cost.
The C/O was the famous Wing Commander Bob McIntosh (All weather Mac) who was, previous to this, the Chief Pilot of Airwork Ltd.
The crews had two weeks a year extra training at RAF Dishforth where two of its Radio Officers,P/O Abrahams and P/O Jellett achieved the rare RAF VIP standard.

Current role
Originally formed as 1359 Flight RAF, it was attached to a Hercules OCU (Operational Conversion Unit), based at RAF Lyneham in Wiltshire in 1994 for a 3-year trial period. After the success of the trial, its role expanded over the years to provide aircrews to all air transport and air-to-air refuelling aircraft of the RAF. It moved to RAF Brize Norton in 2011. On 1 October 2012, in recognition of its continued work with the main squadrons, the flight was authorised by the Standing Committee of the Royal Air Force to be rebadged as 622 (Reserve Aircrew) Squadron.

According to its website, the mission statement is as follows:

Aircraft operated

Squadron bases

References

Notes

Bibliography

External links

 622 Squadron entry at RAF's official site
 No. 622 Squadron RAF movement and equipment history
 Squadron histories and more for nos. 621–650 sqn on RAFWeb

Bomber squadrons of the Royal Air Force in World War II
622 Squadron
Squadrons of the Royal Auxiliary Air Force
Military units and formations established in 1943
Military units and formations disestablished in 1945